Guzmania brasiliensis is a plant species in the genus Guzmania. This species is native to northern Brazil (Amazonas, Roraima), Peru, Colombia, Venezuela and Ecuador.

References

brasiliensis
Flora of South America
Plants described in 1907